is a 2005 action-adventure-racing video game developed by XPEC Entertainment for the PlayStation 2, GameCube, Xbox, and Windows. The game features Hello Kitty and other Sanrio characters.

Hello Kitty Crystal Edition

A Hello Kitty Crystal Xbox was released with Sanrio in Singapore, to commemorate the release of the game on the Xbox.  The special edition console was translucent with a pink and orange Hello Kitty picture covering the X on top of the case.  A limited production run of 550 units was sold at a retail price of S$99 (US$61), if you purchased certain selected Samsung LCD TVs during a promotion.  Included with the Hello Kitty Crystal console was a matching Crystal Controller S and a copy of Hello Kitty Mission Rescue.

Reception

The game received mixed reviews from critics. It holds a 64% rating on Metacritic. IGN rated the game 6 of 10 calling it just "Okay".

References

External links
XPEC game page
Hamster page

2005 video games
Action-adventure games
GameCube games
Roller Rescue
Namco games
PlayStation 2 games
Windows games
Xbox games
Video games developed in Taiwan
Video games featuring female protagonists
RenderWare games
Empire Interactive games
Multiplayer and single-player video games
Hamster Corporation games

sv:Hello Kitty (datorspel)#Hello Kitty: Roller Rescue